The Canon EF-M 55-200mm f/4.5-6.3 IS STM is an interchangeable telezoom lens for the Canon EOS M system of mirrorless cameras. It was announced by Canon on June 17, 2014.

This lens was not initially available from Canon USA, but became available in the US market during October 2015.

References

http://www.dpreview.com/products/canon/lenses/canon_m_55-200_4p5-6p3/specifications
https://web.archive.org/web/20150923031817/http://www.canon.de/for_home/product_finder/cameras/ef_lenses/ef-m/ef_m_55-200mm_f_4.5_6.3_is_stm/
https://web.archive.org/web/20150616021437/http://www.canon.de/images/Preisliste_Canon_Consumer_Produkte_08062015_tcm83-376784.pdf

External links

Canon EF-M-mount lenses
Camera lenses introduced in 2014